Princess Henriette of Liechtenstein (German: Henriette Maria Norberta,  Prinzessin von und zu Liechtenstein; 6 June 1843  – 24 December 1931) was a Princess of Liechtenstein and member of the Princely House of Liechtenstein.

Family
Henriette was the seventh daughter and eighth child of Alois II, Prince of Liechtenstein and his wife Countess Franziska Kinsky of Wchinitz and Tettau. She was a sister of Johann II, Prince of Liechtenstein and Franz I, Prince of Liechtenstein.

Marriage and issue
On 26 April 1865, in Vienna, she married her first cousin Prince Alfred of Liechtenstein (Prague, 11 June 1842 - Frauenthal castle, 8 October 1907), the son of Prince Franz de Paula of Liechtenstein (1802–1887) and Countess Julia Eudoxia Potocka-Piława (1818–1895), older brother of Prince Franz de Paula of Liechtenstein, and cousin and brother-in-law of Franz I of Liechtenstein. The couple had ten children together.

 Princess Franziska Maria Johanna (Vienna, 21 August 1866 - Schloss Frauenthal, 23 December 1939), unmarried and without issue
 Prince Franz de Paula Maria (Vienna, 24 January 1868 - Graz, 26 August 1929), unmarried and without issue
 Princess Julia (Vienna, 24 January 1868 - Vienna, 24 January 1868)
 Prince Aloys of Liechtenstein (1869–1955); married Archduchess Elisabeth Amalie of Austria; renounced his succession rights in favor of his son Franz Joseph II, Prince of Liechtenstein in 1923
 Princess Maria Theresia Julie (Hollenegg, 9 September 1871 - Schloss Frauenthal, 9 April 1964), unmarried and without issue
 Prince Johannes Franz Alfred Maria Caspar Melchior Balthasar (Vienna, 6 January 1873 - Hollenegg, 3 September 1959), 1,220th Knight of the Order of the Golden Fleece in 1921, married in Budapest on 6 September 1906 Marie Gräfin Andrássy von Czik-Szent-Király und Krasna-Horka (Budapest, 7 December 1886 - Vienna, 14 December 1961), and had issue
 Prince Alfred Roman (Vienna, 6 April 1875 - Waldstein bei Peggau, Styria, 25 October 1930), married in Munich on 19 February 1912 Theresia Maria Prinzessin zu Oettingen-Oettingen und Oettingen-Wallerstein (Munich, 1 June 1887 - Waldstein, 29 May 1971), and had issue
 Prince Heinrich Aloys Maria Joseph (Hollenegg, 21 June 1877 - k.i.a. in World War I in Warsaw, 16 August 1915), unmarried and without issue
 Prince Karl Aloys (Frauenthal, 16 September 1878 - Frauenthal, 20 June 1955), married civilly in Stuttgart on 31 March 1921 and religiously in Tegernsee on 5 April 1921 Elisabeth Prinzessin von Urach Gräfin von Württemberg Princess of Lithuania (Schloss Lichtenstein, 23 August 1894 - Frauenthal, 13 October 1962), daughter of Mindaugas II of Lithuania and first wife Duchess Amalie in Bayern, and had issue
 Prince Georg Hartmann Joseph Maria Mathäus (Pater Ildefons, O.S.B.) (Vienna, 22 February 1880 - Hollenegg, 14 April 1931), a Benedictine Monk in Prague

Ancestry

Sources 
 Jean-Charles Volkmann, Généalogie des rois et des princes, éd. Jean-Paul Gisserot, 1998

References

1843 births
1931 deaths
Liechtenstein princesses
19th-century Liechtenstein women
Daughters of monarchs